Bellamy was an Australian television series made by the Reg Grundy Organisation for the Ten Network in 1981.

Synopsis 
The series focused on a maverick cop named Steve Bellamy (John Stanton). His partner was Detective Mitchell (Tim Elston). Recurring characters in the series were the disapproving Daley (James Condon) who appeared in 21 episodes, the forensics technician Clem (Brian Young) who was in 15 of the episodes. Adam Garnett as Ginger, a street-wise child who befriended Bellamy, appeared in six early episodes but was phased-out of the series. Later in the run Tom Richards appeared as Detective Burns over five episodes. In the story Burns was ultimately revealed to be corrupt.

The series was noticeably more violent than previous Australian police series such as those made by Crawford Productions during the 1970s.

Bellamy attracted only mediocre ratings and was shifted around the schedules several times. The series was not renewed beyond the initial series of 26 one-hour episodes.

Notable guest actors appearing in the series included: Sean Scully, Michael Long, Richard Moir, Martin Vaughan, Belinda Giblin, Brian Moll, Betty Lucas, Debra Lawrance, Leslie Dayman, Max Phipps, Jacqui Gordon, Shane Porteous, Anne Tenney, Lisa Crittenden, Peter Adams, Ken James, Briony Behets, Peta Toppano, Diane Craig, Ivar Kants, Gerard Kennedy, Patrick Phillips, Cornelia Frances, Serge Lazareff, Sigrid Thornton, Anna Hruby, Jill Forster, Wayne Jarratt, Joanna Lockwood and Penne Hackforth-Jones.

References

External links
Bellamy at the National Film and Sound Archive
 
Bellamy at AustLit

Network 10 original programming
1981 Australian television series debuts
1981 Australian television series endings
1980s Australian crime television series
English-language television shows
Television series produced by The Reg Grundy Organisation
1980s Australian drama television series